Grästorps IK is a Swedish ice hockey club playing in the third tier of Swedish hockey, Division 1, .  The club's greatest success came in the 1968–69 season when the club played in Division 2, which at the time was the second highest hockey league in Sweden.

Season-by-season

External links
 Official website
 Profile on Eliteprospects.com

Ice hockey teams in Sweden
Ice hockey clubs established in 1956
1956 establishments in Sweden
Ice hockey teams in Västra Götaland County